The 2006 All-Ireland Senior Hurling Championship was the 120th staging of the All-Ireland Senior Hurling Championship, the Gaelic Athletic Association's premier inter-county hurling tournament, since its establishment in 1887. The draw for the provincial fixtures took place on 12 November 2005. The championship began on 14 May 2006 and ended on 3 September 2006

Cork entered the championship as defending champions.

On 3 September 2006, Kilkenny won the championship after a 1–16 to 1–13 defeat of Cork in the All-Ireland final at Croke Park. This was their 29th All-Ireland title overall and their first title since 2003.

Kilkenny's Henry Shefflin was the championship's top scorer with 2-47.

Teams

Overview
Twelve teams participated in hurling's top tier in 2006.

For the first time since 1983, the Ulster champions were not represented in the wider All-Ireland series of games. Antrim, in spite of being Ulster champions in 2005, subsequently lost all of their All-Ireland qualifier games and were relegated to the Christy Ring Cup after being beaten by Offaly and Laois in the relegation play-offs.

Personnel and general information

Provincial championships

Leinster Senior Hurling Championship

Quarter-finals

Semi-finals

Final

Munster Senior Hurling Championship

Quarter-final

Semi-finals

Final

All-Ireland Qualifiers

Group A

Table

Results

Group B

Table

Results

Relegation play-off

All-Ireland Senior Hurling Championship

Quarter-finals

Semi-finals

Final

Championship statistics

Top scorers

Overall

In a single game

References

All-Ireland Senior Hurling Championships